Combining Diacritical Marks is a Unicode block containing the most common combining characters. It also contains the character "Combining Grapheme Joiner", which prevents canonical reordering of combining characters, and despite the name, actually separates characters that would otherwise be considered a single grapheme in a given context. Its block name in Unicode 1.0 was Generic Diacritical Marks.

Block

Character table

History
The following Unicode-related documents record the purpose and process of defining specific characters in the Combining Diacritical Marks block:

See also
 Phonetic symbols in Unicode

References

Unicode blocks